Patrick Joseph McGuinness (born 14 August 1973) is an English actor, comedian and television presenter. He rose to fame with the help of Peter Kay, who invited him to appear in his programmes That Peter Kay Thing, Phoenix Nights and Max and Paddy's Road to Nowhere. He is best known for his roles within Channel 4, ITV and the BBC presenting game shows such as Take Me Out as well as, since 2019, being one of the three hosts of BBC's Top Gear. In 2021, he became the new host of Question of Sport.

Early life 
McGuinness was born on 14 August 1973 in Farnworth, Lancashire, to Irish parents from County Tipperary, and attended Mount St Joseph High School. It was from his school days in Farnworth that McGuinness formed his close friendship with fellow Bolton comedian Peter Kay.

Television
McGuinness made his television debut in 1995 as a contestant for the show God's Gift. He also appeared in the second series of the Sky 1 show The Match. On 15 May 2006, McGuinness hosted Inside Wayne Rooney on Sky 1, a programme where he completed different tasks to see the difference between him and the professional footballer.

McGuinness' other television work includes his own Chuck Stryker: The Unknown Stuntman on E4 which he wrote and starred in opposite Jonathan Wrather and a few other familiar faces.

McGuinness presented Stars in Their Cars, a series for the Travel Channel in 2016.

Rory and Paddy

First airing on 13 August 2008, McGuinness co-starred in a television series with British comedian Rory McGrath, broadcast on Channel 5, Rory and Paddy's Great British Adventure. This was a four-part series in which McGuinness and McGrath embark on a nationwide road-trip, "on a mission to explore Britain's sporting heritage by probing the hidden life of its towns and villages". The series focuses on arcane sports, such as cheese rolling. A second series began on 20 September 2010 on Channel 5.

Channel 4
In 2006, McGuinness guest hosted The Paul O'Grady Show. He presented the entertainment series Hotel GB in 2012. In 2013 McGuinness presented Paddy's TV Guide. In 2014 McGuinness narrated the three-part charity series Stars at Your Service for Channel 4. In 2015, he presented the Channel 4 daytime game show series Benchmark for 30 episodes as well as five celebrity editions.

ITV
In 2007 McGuinness presented Raiders of the Lost Archive. From 2010 until 2019, McGuinness hosted the ITV dating show Take Me Out. He was a guest presenter of This Morning in 2010, a role to which he returned in 2011. He hosted the second series of 71 Degrees North with Charlotte Jackson in 2011. In 2012, he hosted Paddy's Show and Telly. The show returned for a second special in 2013. McGuinness hosted the comedy panel show Mad Mad World for seven episodes in 2012. Two episodes were recorded but never aired. McGuinness was one of the presenters of Christmas telethon Text Santa. In 2012 and 2013, McGuinness co-hosted one hour of the telethon with Christine Bleakley, although Alesha Dixon was his co-presenter for the 2014 appeal.

In 2013 McGuinness co-presented talent show series Your Face Sounds Familiar with Alesha Dixon. In 2014, McGuinness co-hosted the Saturday night game show Amazing Greys alongside Angela Rippon. In 2015, he regularly starred in the ITV2 comedy show The Keith Lemon Sketch Show.

McGuinness played the role of policeman Ian in the ITV comedy The Delivery Man, beginning in April 2015. In 2015, McGuinness guest starred in six episodes of Coronation Street, playing the role of Dougie Ryan. The episodes were shown in August. On Christmas Eve in 2015 he presented one-off ITV special, The ABBA Christmas Party

He starred in the ITV comedy series The Keith & Paddy Picture Show with Keith Lemon in 2017. It returned for a second series in April 2018. In January 2018, McGuinness presented The Greatest TV Moments of All Time, a one-off special for ITV. McGuinness has appeared as a panellist on numerous episodes of Keith Lemon's shows Celebrity Juice and Through the Keyhole. In 2019, he replaced Fearne Cotton as team captain on the former show. He left after one series due to other work commitments.

Paddy co-presented two episodes of Even Better Than the Real Thing on BBC One. McGuinness presented Paddy McGuinness' Sport Relief Warm-Up and was one of the presenters for the 2018 Sport Relief show. He provided the voiceover for the BBC series Ready or Not in 2018.

In 2018 it was announced that McGuinness would be co-presenting series 27 of Top Gear. In 2020, it was announced that Top Gear presenters Freddie Flintoff and Paddy McGuinness would host a six-episode best-of series, featuring the presenters narrating classic episodes of the show, called Total Wipeout: Freddie and Paddy Takeover. The first episode aired on 8 August 2020 and received negative reviews.

In 2021 it was announced that McGuinness will be replacing Sue Barker as host of BBC game show Question of Sport for its 51st series.  On 1 December 2021 a frank and emotive documentary, Paddy and Christine McGuinness: Our Family And Autism was screened on BBC 1.

Radio
McGuinness had his own radio show on Bauer City 1 stations across the North of England on Sunday mornings from 9am until 12 noon. His show ran from 2014 until 2017.

Tours
In 2005 and 2006, McGuinness toured the UK, performing 108 shows. Paddy McGuinness: The Dark Side Tour was his first solo stand-up tour. While on tour, he reprised his role of Lord Love Rocket from the award-winning comedy Phoenix Nights. From 21 August to 11 December 2008, McGuinness was involved in a second tour – known as the Paddy McGuinness Plus You! Live – which included 76 scheduled dates around the UK and Ireland. The Plus You! Tour featured McGuinness, along with other variety acts that were chosen by him, through a competition that ran on his official website, hence the title of Plus You!

In 2011, he went on his third stand-up tour, called Paddy McGuinness: Saturday Night Live Tour. In January 2015, he announced that he would be touring across 2015 and 2016 with the "Daddy McGuinness" tour throughout the UK. The tour opened in Scunthorpe on 28 September 2015 and the final date was at the Hammersmith Apollo in London on 27 February 2016.

Books
In 2010, McGuinness released My Guide to the North: (and Scotland & Wales, oh, and less important places i.e. the South). In 2021 McGuinness released his autobiography, My Lifey.

Other work
In 2010 McGuinness starred in the adult pantomime Panto's on Strike at the Opera House, Manchester with Robbie Williams and Jonathan Wilkes. He starred in a UK TV advertising campaign for Victor Chandler, a British bookmaker. In 2010, 2012, 2014, 2016 and 2018, McGuinness took part in the charity football match Soccer Aid, which raises money for Unicef. The match is aired live on ITV.

In 2012 McGuinness played Gary in Keith Lemon: The Film. In 2013, McGuinness joined Pizza Hut as their brand ambassador.

In 2017 McGuinness joined Jackpot Joy as their brand ambassador, taking over from Dame Barbara Windsor.

Personal life
He married Christine Martin on 4 June 2011. The couple have three children.  In 2020 the family moved from their former £2.1 million home to a modern mansion in Cheshire.

All three of McGuinness's children are autistic, as is their mother. In 2021 they made a BBC documentary Paddy and Christine McGuinness: Our Family and Autism. In June 2018, McGuinness revealed that he had been diagnosed with arthritis several years prior, at the age of 44. 

In 2022 it was announced that McGuiness and his wife had separated, after 11 years of marriage, but will remain living together in their family home.

His brother is Tony Leonard who appeared Max and Paddy's Road to Nowhere as Raymond the Bastard's henchman, a teammate of Paddy's on The F Word, and a featured audience member on Celebrity Juice.

Filmography
Television

Film

Stand-up DVDs
 Live (6 November 2006)
 Plus You! Live (17 November 2008)
 Live 2011 (21 November 2011)
 Paddy Is back Live (14 November 2022)
 Paddy Reloaded (29 February 2023)
 Paddy McGuinness: Bigger, Stronger, Massive (31 April 2023)

Awards and nominations

References

External links

Official Twitter
Paddy McGuinness soundboard
  Paddy McGuinness signs for Victor Chandler

1973 births
Living people
20th-century English comedians
20th-century English male actors
21st-century English comedians
21st-century English male actors
English game show hosts
English male comedians
English male television actors
English male voice actors
English people of Irish descent
English stand-up comedians
English television personalities
English television presenters
Male actors from Lancashire
People from Farnworth
Top Gear people
English autobiographers